Abu Muhammad Ziyadat Allah I ibn Ibrahim ibn al-Aghlab (died June 10, 838) was the Emir in Ifriqiya from 817 until his death in 838.

Abu Muhammad Ziyadat Allah I succeeded his brother Abdallah I (812–817) to the Emirate of Ifriqiya. During his rule the relationship between the ruling dynasty on the one hand and the jurists and Arab troops on the other remained strained. When Ziyadat Allah I attempted to disband the Arab units in 824, it led to a great revolt at Tunis, which was only put down in 836 with the help of the Berbers.

Ziyadat had already begun campaigns in Italy in an attempt to divert the restless Arab troops, and so in 827 there began the gradual conquest of Sicily from the Byzantine Empire, under the jurist Asad ibn al-Furat. Although initially repulsed by the Byzantines, they managed to conquer Palermo in 831. Power struggles on the Italian mainland afforded further opportunity for conquest and plunder - a call for aid from the Duke of Naples enabled them to establish a foothold in southern Italy and begin extensive raids against the Christians.

The economic health of the kingdom, in spite of the political unrest, enabled a substantial building programme. The mosque of Uqba ibn Nafi in Kairuan was renovated and refurnished, and more city defenses were erected. Ziyadat Allah I wasn't the first of the Aghlabids to convert to mu'tazilism, but he appointed, with his mu'tazilite qadi of Qairawan Abu Muhriz al Kilabi (appointed by Ibrahim I in 806), Assad ibn al Furat, considered one of the most important sunni leaders of his time in Ifriqya. The majority of the Aghlabid rulers stayed loyal to mu'tazilism until their end in 909 (except during the rule of Muhammad I), even after it was rejected by the Abbasids in 848.

After the death of Ziyadat Allah I his brother Abu Iqal (838–841) became Emir.

Portrayal
Ziyadat Allah, a character played by Kal Naga, in the 5th season of the historical fantasy television series Vikings is loosely based on Ziyadat Allah I.

Sources
 

838 deaths
Aghlabid emirs of Ifriqiya
Arab people of the Arab–Byzantine wars
Year of birth unknown
Mu'tazilism